Spellfire is a fantasy novel written by Ed Greenwood and published in 1987. It is the first novel in Ed Greenwood's book series, Shandril's Saga, and takes place in the Forgotten Realms setting based on the Dungeons & Dragons fantasy role-playing game.

Plot summary
The book follows the journey of an orphaned girl named Shandril who later leaves her home and embarks on a journey, thus discovering love, and of course Spellfire.

Reception
In the Io9 series revisiting older Dungeons & Dragons novels, Rob Bricken commented that "This book is terrible. It's the sort of top-to-bottom awfulness I expected to encounter when I started looking back at these D&D novels but then forgot about after I was lulled into a false sense of security by nominal competency of the first few books."

Reviews
Kliatt

References

External links
 http://www.goodreads.com/work/editions/2789369-spellfire-shandril-s-saga-1 - several editions of this book exist. Later editions added several chapters.

1987 American novels
1987 fantasy novels
Forgotten Realms novels
Novels about orphans
Novels by Ed Greenwood